Lake Minnewaska may refer to:

Lake Minnewaska (Minnesota)
Lake Minnewaska (New York)